The 1956 Texas gubernatorial election was held on November 6, 1956, to elect the governor of Texas. Incumbent Democratic Governor Allan Shivers did not run for a fourth term. Senator Price Daniel won the election with over 78% of the vote.

Primaries

Democratic

Results

References

Texas gubernatorial elections
Texas
1956 Texas elections